National Gallery of Modern Art, Mumbai was opened to the public in 1996. It hosts various exhibitions and art collections of famous artists, sculptors and different civilizations. It is situated in the Cowasji Jehangir Hall, near Regal Cinema in Colaba.

History

The idea of a National art gallery was first mooted in 1949, and further developed by Prime Minister Jawahar Lal Nehru and Maulana Azad, bureaucrats such as Humayun Kabir and the local art community. Vice-president Dr. S.Radhakrishnan formally inaugurated the NGMA in the presence of Prime Minister Jawaharlal Nehru and artists and art lovers of the city on 29 March 1954. The choice of Jaipur House, one of the premier edifices of Lutyens’ Delhi, signified the envisaged high profile of the institution. Designed by Sir Arthur Blomfield, as a residence for the Maharaja of Jaipur, the butterfly-shaped building with a central dome was built in 1936. It was styled after a concept of the Central Hexagon visualised by Sir Edwin Lutyens. It was Lutyens, along with Herbert Baker, who visualized and gave shape to the new capital in Delhi. Along with buildings designed for other princely potentates like Bikaner and Hyderabad, Jaipur House girded the India Gate circle.

NGMA's inauguration was marked by an exhibition of sculptures. Prominent sculptors of the time including Debi Prasad Roy Chowdhury, Ramkinkar Baij, Sankho Chaudhuri, Dhanraj Bhagat, Sarbari Roy Chowdhury and others had participated. The show was prepared by NGMA's first curator Herman Goetz. A noted German art historian, Goetz had earlier been responsible for setting up the Baroda Museum.

The Gallery is run and administered as a subordinate office to the Department of Culture, Government of India, and showcases the changing art forms through the passage of the last hundred and fifty years starting from about 1857 in the field of Visual art and Plastic arts.

Collection
 A collection of Pablo Picasso's works
 Egyptian artifacts such as mummies, statues, etc.
Bibliography:
Ella Datta, Treasures of National Gallery of Modern Art..MAPIN(Ahmedabad)

See also
 Kolkata Museum of Modern Art
 National Gallery of Modern Art, Bangalore
 National Gallery of Modern Art, New Delhi

References

External links

 NGMA Web site

Art museums and galleries in Mumbai
Museums established in 1996
1996 establishments in Maharashtra

de:National Gallery of Modern Art
hi:राष्ट्रीय आधुनिक कला संग्रहालय
he:הגלריה הלאומית לאמנות מודרנית (ניו דלהי)